The Dhasan River is a river in central India. A right bank tributary of the Betwa River, it originates in Begumganj tehsil (Raisen district, Madhya Pradesh).

The river forms the southeastern boundary of the Lalitpur District of Uttar Pradesh state. Its total length is 365 km, out of which 240 km lies in Madhya Pradesh, 54 km common boundary between Madhya Pradesh and Uttar Pradesh, and 71 km in Uttar Pradesh. Bela, 

Kathan, Mangrar, Bachneri and Rohni are among its tributaries.

Human Activity 
Two dams have been built on Dhasan: one at Pahari and one further down at Lahchura. A three-branched irrigational canal was opened in 1910, diverting some of the river's flow and providing water for the Bundelkhand region.

The river was known as the Dasharna in ancient times. Residents of nearby villages regard this river as a holy river.

See also 
 River basins in Madhya Pradesh

References 

Rivers of Madhya Pradesh
Rivers of Uttar Pradesh
Rivers of India
Betwa River